Yassine Sahli (born 23 November 1987) is a retired Tunisian football defender.

References

1987 births
Living people
Tunisian footballers
CA Bizertin players
ES Zarzis players
ES Métlaoui players
JS Kairouan players
Association football defenders
Tunisian Ligue Professionnelle 1 players